The FZ275 LGR - Laser Guided Rocket is a weapon system by Thales (formerly Forges de Zeebrugge). It is intended to provide a low-cost guided missile compatible with existing unguided 70mm rocket launch platforms. The HE (High Explosive) version of the FZ275 LGR is equipped with a HE warhead with impact fuze.

Program status
 2006 – Program start
 November 2010 – First successful firing
 October 2015 – Successful air-to-ground test firing onboard South-African (SAAF) Rooivalk helicopter at Denel Overberg Test Range (OTB) 
 December 2017 - Test firings at the Älvdalen test range

Specifications 

 Diameter: 70 mm (2.75 in)
 Length: 1.8m
 Weight: 12.5 kg /9.1 kg (after burn)
 Guidance: SAL - Semi-Active Laser. 
 Steering type : 4 folding canards
 Laser : compatible with STANAG 3733 or used defined code
 Range from Sea Level: Min: 1.5 km Max: 8 km
 Motor: FZ276 MOD.2 rocket motor
 Warhead: FZ319 HE warhead with MK352 impact fuze

See also 

 Direct Attack Guided Rocket
 Low-Cost Guided Imaging Rocket
 Advanced Precision Kill Weapon System
 Roketsan Cirit
 Guided Advanced Tactical Rocket – Laser

References 

Guided missiles